Daft Club is the first remix album by the French electronic music duo Daft Punk, released on 1 December 2003 by Virgin Records. The album features numerous remixes of tracks from their second album, Discovery (2001), and one from their debut, Homework (1997).

Background
The name of the album comes from Daft Punk's online music service, which featured remixed songs, a live recording of Daft Punk performing at the Que Club (which would later be released as Alive 1997), and an a cappella and instrumental version of "Harder, Better, Faster, Stronger". The service was available for free to people who bought early versions of the Discovery album.  Each album included a "Daft Club" membership card, which granted access to the Daft Club website. The service ended in January 2003.

In regards to the album and online music service, Thomas Bangalter stated:

Limited edition copies of the film Interstella 5555: The 5tory of the 5ecret 5tar 5ystem featured Daft Club as a second disc. The track "Something About Us (Love Theme from Interstella 5555)" is omitted from this version. A limited edition of this album was also released in Japan. It includes an extra track and a bonus DVD-Video. The DVD contains a preview of Interstella 5555, interviews in English with Daft Punk, a music video for "Crescendolls" from the film and a video for "Something About Us" that includes a montage of various scenes.

Tracks from Discovery were remixed in Daft Club except "Nightvision", "Superheroes", "High Life", "Veridis Quo" and "Short Circuit". In place of these tracks are additional remixes of "Face to Face", "Harder, Better, Faster, Stronger" and "Aerodynamic", respectively. Also featured is the "Aerodynamic" B-side titled "Aerodynamite", the previously unreleased track "Ouverture" and a remix of the Homework track "Phoenix".

Critical reception
Daft Club received mixed reviews. An extremely negative review by Pitchfork features an artist's illustrated interpretations of how the remixed songs compare to the original versions. The review also stated that [the album]'s contributors "all seem intent upon completely decimating the source material" and that "to listen to Daft Club front-to-back is–and it's pointless to exaggerate here–to watch a loved one be physically dismembered."

Track listing

Charts

References

External links

Web archive of Daft Club website

Album chart usages for Switzerland
Daft Punk remix albums
2003 remix albums
Virgin Records remix albums